Washington Building may refer to:

Washington Building (Culver City, California), listed on the National Register of Historic Places in Los Angeles County, California
Elyria High School - Washington Building, Elyria, Ohio, listed on the National Register of Historic Places in Lorain County, Ohio
International Mercantile Marine Company Building, 1 Broadway, Manhattan, originally the Washington Building
Washington Gas and Electric Building, Longview, Washington, listed on the National Register of Historic Places in Cowlitz County, Washington
Washington Building (Richmond, Virginia)
Washington Building (Seattle), see Puget Sound Plaza